A by-election was held for the Australian House of Representatives seat of Grampians on 20 February 1915. This was triggered by the death of Labor MP Edward Jolley.

The by-election was won by Liberal candidate Carty Salmon, who had previously served as member for Laanecoorie from 1901 to 1913 and as Speaker from 1909 to 1910.

Results

References

1915 elections in Australia
Victorian federal by-elections
1910s in Victoria (Australia)